Bartholomew Bertram Horrigan (August 28, 1880 – August 5, 1970) was an American politician in the state of Washington. He served in the Washington House of Representatives.

References

Democratic Party members of the Washington House of Representatives
1880 births
1970 deaths
20th-century American politicians